Anna Davida Shapiro (born March 10, 1966) is an American  theater director, was the artistic director of the Steppenwolf Theater Company, and a professor at Northwestern University. Throughout her career, she has directed both the Steppenwolf Theater Company production of August: Osage County (2007) along with its Broadway debut (2008-2009), the Broadway debuts of The Motherfucker with the Hat (2011) and Fish in the Dark (2014), and Broadway revivals of This Is Our Youth and Of Mice and Men, both in 2014. She won the Tony Award for Best Direction of a Play for her direction of August: Osage County.

Early years
Shapiro was born in Evanston, Illinois, the youngest of four children. She attended Evanston Township High School and graduated in 1983. She later went on to receive a Bachelor of Arts in theater direction from Columbia College Chicago in 1990. She then attended graduate school and received a Master of Fine Arts at the Yale School of Drama, and was the recipient of a 1996 Princess Grace Award.

Career
Her credits include the premieres of Until We Find Each Other, The Pain and the Itch, Purple Heart, Three Days of Rain, Drawer Boy, I Never Sang for my Father, A Fair Country, Iron and Man from Nebraska. She also directed Edwin Sanchez's Trafficking in Broken Hearts for the Atlantic Theater Company.  She directed the world premieres of The Ordinary Yearning of Miriam Buddwing by Alexandra Gersten-Vassilaros at Steppenwolf in 2001, and Bruce Norris's The Infidel at both Steppenwolf and the Philadelphia Theatre Company.

After directing Tracy Letts' August: Osage County at Steppenwolf and winning the Jefferson Award for Best Director, she directed the play on Broadway, with all but two of the original cast, and won the 2008 Tony Award for Best Director of a Play, as well as the Drama Desk Award and the Outer Critics Circle Award for Outstanding Director of a Play.  August: Osage County was named by Time magazine as its number one theater production for 2007.

On Broadway, Shapiro also directed Of Mice and Men and This Is Our Youth (2014). She directed the Larry David play, Fish in the Dark on Broadway at the Cort Theatre, which opened in February 2015.

Shapiro has been on the faculty of Northwestern University as head of the Graduate Directing Program in Theatre since 2002. She has been affiliated with Steppenwolf Theatre since 1995, serving as the original director of the New Plays Lab and later joining the artistic staff as resident director. Shapiro is an artistic associate and became a member of the ensemble in 2005. She was named the artistic director of Steppenwolf in September 2015.

Personal life
She is married to actor Ian Barford, and they have two children.

References

External links
 
  (archive)
 
 Anna Shapiro at Northwestern University
 Anna D. Shapiro at Steppenwolf Theatre Company

Yale School of Drama alumni
Northwestern University faculty
American theatre directors
Drama Desk Award winners
Artists from Evanston, Illinois
Tony Award winners
1967 births
Living people
Princess Grace Awards winners
Women theatre directors
Steppenwolf Theatre Company players